Stefan Vidović (born 8 August 1992) is a Montenegrin water polo player. He competed in the 2020 Summer Olympics.

References

1992 births
Living people
People from Kotor
People from Herceg Novi
Water polo players at the 2020 Summer Olympics
Montenegrin male water polo players
Olympic water polo players of Montenegro